Streptomyces lunalinharesii is a chitinolytic bacterium species from the genus of Streptomyces which has been isolated from soil in Brazil.

See also 
 List of Streptomyces species

References

Further reading

External links
Type strain of Streptomyces lunalinharesii at BacDive -  the Bacterial Diversity Metadatabase	

lunalinharesii
Bacteria described in 2008